Matthews Arena (formerly Boston Arena) is a multi-purpose arena in Boston, Massachusetts. It is the world's oldest multi-purpose athletic building still in use, as well as the oldest arena in use for ice hockey.

The arena opened in 1910 on what is now the east end of Northeastern University's campus. It is the original home of the National Hockey League (NHL) Boston Bruins — the only team of the NHL's Original Six whose original home arena still exists for the sport of ice hockey; the WHA New England Whalers (now the NHL Carolina Hurricanes); and the NBA's Boston Celtics.

Today, Matthews Arena is owned by the university. It is used by the Northeastern Huskies men's and women's ice hockey teams, and men's basketball team as well as various high school ice hockey programs in the city of Boston. The venue also hosts Northeastern's graduation ceremonies, its annual Springfest concert, and other events.

The closest MBTA station is the Massachusetts Ave Orange Line subway station; the Green Line E branch's underground Symphony station is two blocks northwest.

History
Originally named the Boston Arena, groundbreaking took place on October 11, 1909. 1896 United States skating champion Herbert S. Evans dug the first portion of earth. The arena was to have a capacity of 5,000 and was to be used for ice skating, curling, horse shows, and a variety of sporting events. The arena had its own power plant, which powered the two 100-ton ice machines and all of the arena’s lighting. Charles C. Abbey was the first president and treasurer of the Boston Arena Company and William T. Richardson was the building’s first general manager. The arena was scheduled to open on Christmas Day 1909, but construction delays pushed back the opening until April 25, 1910. The arena’s inaugural event was an ice carnival to benefit the Sharon Sanatorium. Skating events were held throughout the day, including a performance by Irving Brokaw. The area’s first hockey game was won by the Harvard Freshmen hockey team, who defeated Newton High School 4 to 0. The Harvard varsity squad played later that evening, losing to Crescent H. C. 1-0. 

The Arena was partially destroyed by fire on December 18, 1918. It was rebuilt, and the new facility opened January 1, 1921, with an ice show. Harvard played the first hockey game after being reopened, January 8, 1921, against Kings College.

The first games of professional ice hockey at the Arena took place in March 1911 when a two-game $2,500 competition between two NHA teams, the Montreal Wanderers and the Ottawa Senators took place. The NHL's first US-based franchise, the Boston Bruins, played their first-ever NHL regular season game at the Arena on Monday, December 1, 1924. with the Bruins' most historic rivalry with the Montreal Canadiens being initiated only one week later. The Bruins left the Arena in 1928 when Tex Rickard's new indoor sports facility in Boston, the Boston Garden, was completed. The WHA's New England Whalers played some of their first-season home games at the Arena in 1972–73.

Matthews is where the hockey programs of Boston College, Boston University, Harvard, MIT, Northeastern University, Tufts University, Boston State College (later merged into the University of Massachusetts Boston) and Wentworth Institute of Technology all began; in particular, it housed the Boston University hockey team until 1971, when Walter Brown Arena was built.

In basketball, the Boston Celtics played their first game at the Arena in 1946, and played at the Arena until 1955.

The Arena was purchased in 1979 by Northeastern University. The Arena was renamed in 1982 when Northeastern alumnus George J. Matthews helped fund its refurbishment. The arena was briefly known as Northeastern Arena as well. Another round of renovations took place in the summer of 2009. The centerpiece of the renovations were all-new seating and a brand new center ice jumbotron. In 2018, a new jumbotron was installed, currently one of the largest videoboards in the Northeastern US. The lobby was also reworked, with additional concessions and an elevator for ADA compliance. A new weight room and expanded locker rooms were provided for the athletes. The total cost of the renovations was estimated at $12 million. It still shares a feature with both the 1998-demolished Boston Garden pro sports facility and Harvard's existing Bright-Landry Hockey Center where ice hockey is concerned; with non-standard team bench locations, one on either side of the rink, much as the departed Garden possessed. This feature was for years not uncommon on rinks throughout the East, as the Montreal Forum and Le Colisée de Québec both had split benches for much of their histories. The reason behind this arrangement was so teams could have their benches adjacent to their dressing rooms, which were across the ice from each other for security reasons. Most modern facilities solved this dilemma not by placing dressing rooms on opposite sides of the ice, as those arenas did, but rather on opposite ends on the same side of the rink. However this arrangement still exists in American collegiate hockey, as even some newer venues such as Conte Forum at Boston College or Compton Family Ice Arena at Notre Dame have split benches.

Matthews Arena has played host to many famous people and events during its lifetime. Matthews hosted every president from Theodore Roosevelt in 1912 to John F. Kennedy in 1946. Other dignitaries to hold events at the arena include Charles Lindbergh and Amelia Earhart. Boxing was once a mainstay at the arena and hosted bouts with Jack Sharkey, Jack Dempsey, Gene Tunney, Joe Louis and Marvin Hagler. Muhammad Ali trained at what was called Santos Gym, where the Varsity Club now sits, for his second bout with Sonny Liston. Professional wrestling events were also staged there. In the 1950s the arena also hosted the Rodeo led by Roy Rogers and Dale Evans.

Matthews Arena also proved famous as a concert venue during much of its lifetime. On Saturday evening May 3, 1958 the 'Big Beat' Rock n Roll show hosted by Alan Freed was cut short due to riots inside the Arena and a non-fatal serious stabbing outside. Headlining the bill were Jerry Lee Lewis, Chuck Berry, and Buddy Holly & The Crickets. Alan Freed was arrested after police repeatedly had the house-lights turned on to stop teens jiving in the aisles, and Freed issued the now infamous line, "I guess the police don't want you to have fun." Other famous acts to grace the arena were The Doors in a 1970 concert that was later released to the public. Another famous concert was the Phish New Year's Eve concert on December 31, 1992. The show was the highest attended Phish concert to date and was played on WBCN the next day.

Matthews has hosted all or part of the America East Conference men's basketball tournament a total of seven times and hosted the 1960 Frozen Four. The arena also served as the original home to the annual Beanpot tournament between Boston's four major college hockey programs.

See also
 Huntington Avenue Grounds, site of the nearby first home of the Boston Red Sox baseball team (playing there 1901–1911), existed on current Northeastern University property
 List of NCAA Division I basketball arenas

References

External links

 Men's hockey media guide, 2007-08 season
 Matthews Arena page, NU Athletics website

College ice hockey venues in the United States
Northeastern University buildings
Basketball venues in Massachusetts
Sports venues in Boston
Sports venues completed in 1910
Indoor ice hockey venues in the United States
Indoor ice hockey venues in Massachusetts
College basketball venues in the United States
Defunct National Hockey League venues
World Hockey Association venues
Former National Basketball Association venues
Buildings and structures completed in 1910
Boston Celtics venues
1910 establishments in Massachusetts
Boston Bruins
Hartford Whalers